Convolvulus erinaceus is a species of plant in the family Convolvulaceae. It is native to the Central Asia and the Near East.

References

erinaceus
Flora of Afghanistan
Flora of Iran
Flora of Kazakhstan
Flora of Kyrgyzstan
Flora of Pakistan
Flora of Saudi Arabia
Flora of Tajikistan
Flora of Georgia (country)
Flora of Turkmenistan
Flora of Uzbekistan